Gabriel Manigault (March 17, 1758 – November 4, 1809) was an American architect.

Early life
Manigault was born in Charleston, South Carolina on March 17, 1758. He was the son of Elizabeth Wragg Manigault (1736–1773) and Peter Manigault (1731–1773), the wealthiest person in British North America in 1770. His sister, Henrietta Manigault, was the wife of Nathaniel Heyward, a wealthy rice planter who accumulated at least twenty-two plantations and assorted lands throughout the low country.

His great-grandfather was Pierre Manigault (1664–1729), a French Huguenot who was born in La Rochelle, France and settled in Charleston.

Career
He went to study in Geneva, Switzerland, and London, and came back to Charleston after the American Revolutionary War.  He employed Greek Revival and Adamesque styles.

His works include the Joseph Manigault House in Charleston, South Carolina, a National Historic Landmark, designed in the Adam style of Robert Adam, built in 1790.

In Charleston, he designed the Charleston City Hall (South Carolina) but designed only five homes.  He may have designed Presqui'ile and William Blacklock House.

Between the late 1780s and 1790s, the family traveled north frequently, visiting the Izard family who lived in New York.  In 1805, Manigault sold part of his South Carolina land, and moved permanently to Clifton, an estate near Philadelphia, Pennsylvania.

Personal life

In 1785, Manigault was married to Margaret Izard (1768–1824), the daughter of Alice (née DeLancey) Izard and Ralph Izard, a member of the Continental Congress and a United States senator from South Carolina from 1789 to 1805.  After her father's death in 1804, her mother lived in Philadelphia. Together, Gabriel and Margaret were the parents of:

 Harriet Manigault, who married Samuel Wilcocks.
 Elizabeth Manigault Morris (1785–1822), who married Lewis Morris (1785–1863), a grandson of Lewis Morris, 3rd and last Lord of Morrisania Manor who was a Continental Congressman and signer of the Declaration of Independence.
 Peter Manigault (1788–1788), who died young.
 Gabriel Henry Manigault (1788–1834), who married his first cousin, Anne Manigault Heyward (1800–1855).
 Ann Manigault (d. 1792)
 Charlotte Manigault
 Charles Izard Manigault (1795–1874), who married his first cousin, Elizabeth Heyward (1808–1877).
 Emma Manigault
 Ann Manigault (d. 1800)
 Edward Manigault
 Caroline Manigault.

He died in Philadelphia, Pennsylvania on November 4, 1809.

Descendants
Through his daughter Elizabeth, he was the grandfather of Margaret Ann "Meta" Morris (1810–1881), who married John Berkley Grimball; and Capt. Charles Manigault Morris (1820–1895) of the Confederate States Navy.

References

External links
 Manigault, Morris, and Grimball Family Papers, 1795-1832
 

1758 births
1809 deaths
Artists from Charleston, South Carolina
American architects
Gabriel